The Periya‌ purāṇa‌m (Tamil: பெரிய‌ புராண‌ம்), that is, the great purana or epic, sometimes called Tiruttontarpuranam ("Tiru-Thondar-Puranam", the Purana of the Holy Devotees), is a Tamil poetic account depicting the lives of the sixty-three Nayanars, the canonical poets of Tamil Shaivism. It was compiled during the 12th century by Sekkilhar. It provides evidence of trade with West Asia. The Periya Puranam is part of the corpus of Shaiva canonical works.

Sekkilhar compiled and wrote the Periya Puranam or the Great Purana in Tamil about the life stories of the sixty-three Shaiva Nayanars, poets of the God Shiva who composed the liturgical poems of the Tirumurai, and was later himself canonised and the work became part of the sacred canon. Among all the hagiographic Puranas in Tamil, Sekkilhar's Tiruttondar Puranam or Periyapuranam, composed during the rule of Kulottunga II (1133–1150 CE) stands first.

Background 
Sekkilhar was a poet and the chief minister in the court of the Chola King, Kulothunga Chola II. Kulottunga Chola II, king Anabaya Chola, was a staunch devotee of Lord Siva Natraja at Chidambaram. He continued the reconstruction of the center of Tamil Saivism that was begun by his ancestors. However, Kulottunga II was also enchanted by the Jain courtly epic, Chivaka Chinthamani an  epic of erotic flavour (sringara rasa) whose hero, Chivaka, combines heroics and erotics to marry eight damsels and gain a kingdom. In the end he realises the transiency of possessions, renounces his kingship and finally attains Nirvana by prolonged austerity (tapas).

In order to wean Kulottunga Chola II from the heretical Chivaka Chintamani, Sekkilhar undertook the task of writing the Periyapuranam.

Periyapuranam 
The study of Chivaka Chintamani by Kulottunga Chola II, deeply affected Sekkilhar who was very religious in nature. He exhorted the king to abandon the pursuit of impious erotic literature and turn instead to the life of the Saiva saints celebrated by Sundaramurti Nayanar and Nambiyandar Nambi. The king thereupon invited Sekkilhar to expound the lives of the Saiva saints in a great poem. As a minister of the state Sekkilhar had access to the lives of the saints and after he collected the data, he wrote the poem in the Thousand Pillared Hall of the Chidambaram temple. Legend has it that the Lord himself provided Sekkilhar with the first feet of the first verse as a divine voice from the sky declaring "உலகெலாம்" (ulakelam: All the world).

This work is considered the most important initiative of Kulottunga Chola II's reign. Although, it is only a literary embellishment of earlier hagiographies of the Saiva saints composed by Sundarar and Nambiyandar Nambi, it came to be seen as the epitome of high standards of the Chola culture, because of the highest order of the literary style. The Periyapuranam is considered a fifth Veda in Tamil and immediately took its place as the twelfth and the last book in the Saiva canon. It is considered one of the masterpieces of the Tamil literature and worthily commemorates the Golden age of the Cholas.

Significance 
All the saints mentioned in this epic poem are historical persons and not mythical. Therefore, this is a recorded history of the 63 Saiva saints called as Nayanmars (devotees of Lord Siva), who attain salvation by their unflinching devotion to Siva. The Nayanmars that he talks about belonged to different communities, different occupations and lived in different times.

References

External links 
 Periya Puranam in Tamil.
 Periya Puranam in English.
 Nayanar temples locations explained in Periya puranam
  Periya Puram as per Mahaperiyava

 
Tamil-language literature
Texts related to Nayanar saints
Puranas